Ethinylestradiol sulfonate/norethisterone acetate (EES/NETA), sold under the brand name Deposiston, is a combination medication of ethinylestradiol sulfonate (EES), an estrogen, and norethisterone acetate (NETA), a progestin, which was used as a combined birth control pill for women. It was formulated as oral tablets and contained 1 mg EES and 5 mg NETA per tablet. The medication had a long-lasting depot effect and was taken only once per week, for a total of four tablets per cycle. It was developed and marketed by Jenapharm and was previously available in Germany. EES/NETA was introduced for medical use in 1978.

See also
 List of combined sex-hormonal preparations § Estrogens and progestogens

References

Abandoned drugs
Combined estrogen–progestogen formulations